The Gabor transform, named after Dennis Gabor, and the Wigner distribution function, named after Eugene Wigner, are both tools for time-frequency analysis. Since the Gabor transform does not have high clarity, and the Wigner distribution function has a "cross term problem" (i.e. is non-linear), a 2007 study by S. C. Pei and J. J. Ding proposed a new combination of the two transforms that has high clarity and no cross term problem.
Since the cross term does not appear in the Gabor transform, the time frequency distribution of the Gabor transform can be used as a filter to filter out the cross term in the output of the Wigner distribution function.

Mathematical definition
 Gabor transform

 Wigner distribution function

 Gabor–Wigner transform
There are many different combinations to define the Gabor–Wigner transform. Here four different definitions are given.

See also
 Time-frequency representation
 Short-time Fourier transform
 Gabor transform
 Wigner distribution function

References

Integral transforms